Anuj Kailash Dal (born 8 July 1996) is an English cricketer. He made his Twenty20 debut for Derbyshire in the 2018 t20 Blast on 8 July 2018. He made his List A debut on 26 April 2019 for Derbyshire in the 2019 Royal London One-Day Cup. In September 2021, in the 2021 County Championship, Dal scored his maiden century in first-class cricket.

References

External links
 

1996 births
Living people
English cricketers
Derbyshire cricketers
Sportspeople from Newcastle-under-Lyme
English people of Indian descent
British sportspeople of Indian descent
British Asian cricketers